The 2002 Malaysian Grand Prix was a Formula One motor race held on 17 March 2002 at the Sepang International Circuit and was the second round of the 2002 Formula One season. The Grand Prix is notable for the first lap collision between Williams driver Juan Pablo Montoya and Ferrari driver Michael Schumacher, which led to Montoya being given a drive-through penalty. This decision led to much criticism for the Malaysian stewards, with Schumacher commenting that the decision was "overly harsh" on Montoya.

The Grand Prix was won by the Williams-BMW of German Ralf Schumacher, who commented that it was "almost a perfect race". He was followed by teammate Montoya, and following them in third was Ralf's brother, Michael Schumacher. The race was followed by a decision by the FIA to give stewards more powers over the punishments of drivers who are involved in incidents which are deemed "avoidable".

Practice 
The Friday morning session saw the two Ferrari cars of Michael Schumacher and Rubens Barrichello fastest, the closest car to the Ferraris was Sauber's Nick Heidfeld, who was over one and a half seconds slower. McLaren got the better of Ferrari for the second session with Kimi Räikkönen fastest and his teammate David Coulthard was just over half a second behind him, while the Ferrari of Schumacher was over a second slower than Räikkönen's McLaren in third.

Like the Friday sessions, the Saturday sessions were split into two separate sessions, although both sessions were held during the morning. The Ferraris were fastest in the first session, although this time the closest non-Ferrari driver, which was Räikkönen, was under a second behind them. The Williams of Montoya was fastest in the final practice session before qualifying with Räikkönen second fastest and Montoya's teammate, Ralf Schumacher, third fastest.

Qualifying
Qualifying saw Michael Schumacher take his first pole position of the 2002 season, with only the next three drivers being under a second slower than Schumacher's time, the closest being Juan Pablo Montoya who was under a quarter of a second slower. Schumacher's teammate, Barrichello and Montoya's teammate, Ralf Schumacher, were third and fourth respectively.

Qualifying classification

Race

Before the parade lap, the Arrows of Heinz-Harald Frentzen stalled on the grid for the second time in succession. The German got his car running and managed retain his grid position.

The start of the race saw Michael Schumacher immediately cut Montoya, making the Colombian brake and avoid a collision, this allowed Barrichello to get alongside Montoya coming into the first corner. Montoya however managed to out-brake the Brazilian into the first corner and thus was alongside Schumacher going through the corner. As the Williams and Ferrari travelled through the corner, Schumacher's Ferrari started to experience understeer and went into Montoya's car, taking the Ferrari front wing off. The incident left Montoya going wide and going off the track for a brief moment.

This left Barrichello in the lead with Schumacher's Ferrari, minus a front-wing, in second place and his brother Ralf in third. Michael Schumacher came into the pits for a new nose, promoting Ralf to second. The second lap saw a collision between the two Jordans of Giancarlo Fisichella and Takuma Sato, when the latter ran into the back of the former. "I am really sorry about what happened," said Sato after the race, "I apologized to Giancarlo immediately after the race and he took it very well which I think says a lot of good things about his character" he added. On lap 7, Montoya was given a drive through penalty which cost the Colombian 20 seconds to Barrichello's lead, it was the first drive through penalty in Formula One, as the penalty was added to the list of penalties for the stewards.

The race at the front was between Barrichello; Ralf Schumacher and the two McLarens of Räikkönen and David Coulthard. The two McLarens soon dropped out, both retirements were due to an engine failure. This left the Ferrari and the Williams to battle for the lead, albeit on different strategies, with Barrichello on two stops and Ralf on one-stop. Barrichello was 21 seconds ahead but rejoined 5 seconds behind after his second stop on lap 35. He then closed in on Ralf at a second a lap, and was just 1.2 seconds behind when his engine failed on lap 39, leaving Ralf over 30 seconds ahead of the field with Jenson Button second, with Montoya and Schumacher third and fifth in their recovery drives, with Nick Heidfeld between them.

Montoya got past Button, despite the Brit's defensive driving and moved up into second behind his teammate. The Williams pair went on to finish first and second, making it the first Williams 1–2 since the 1996 Portuguese Grand Prix.

Button, who was now demoted to third, look on course to take his first podium finish of his F1 career, but a suspension problem gave the Ferrari of Michael Schumacher the last podium finish, leaving Button to take fourth place, his first points scoring finish for his new team, Renault. The final two points positions are taken by the two Saubers of Heidfeld and Massa; it was the first points scoring finish for Massa.

Post-race 
The decision to penalise Montoya was met with a host of criticism. The head steward at the event, Nazir Hoosein, had a history of making strange decisions, as he was head steward at the 1998 British Grand Prix, where Michael Schumacher won the race in the pitlane, which led to Hoosein losing his license to be a steward for a year.

Michael Schumacher later commented that he thought it was "overly harsh" on Montoya for the incident, while Montoya himself commented that it was "very unfair" and that he "gave Michael room" and commented that Schumacher "understeered and touched him" before adding that "it was a racing incident".

Championship wise, Michael Schumacher's lead in the Drivers' Championship decreased by two points while the Williams team moved up to take the lead in the Constructors' Championship with 22 points to Ferrari's 14.

Race classification

Championship standings after the race 

Drivers' Championship standings

Constructors' Championship standings

Note: Only the top five positions are included for both sets of standings.

References

Malaysian Grand Prix
Malaysian Grand Prix
Grand Prix
Malaysian Grand Prix